Marbury cum Quoisley is a civil parish in Cheshire East, England. It contains 11 buildings that are recorded in the National Heritage List for England as designated listed buildings. Of these, one is listed at Grade II*, the middle grade, and the others are at Grade II. Apart from the village of Marbury the parish is rural. The major buildings in the parish are St Michael's Church and Marbury Hall; these and some associated buildings are listed. Also listed are some 16th and 17th-century houses and farm buildings that are timber-framed or incorporate timber framing. The parish includes the part of the Combermere estate that contains a monumental obelisk that is listed.

Key

Buildings

See also

Listed buildings in Bickley
Listed buildings in Dodcott cum Wilkesley
Listed buildings in Norbury
Listed buildings in Tushingham cum Grindley
Listed buildings in Whitchurch Urban, Shropshire
Listed buildings in Wirswall
Listed buildings in Wrenbury cum Frith

References
Citations

Sources

 

Listed buildings in the Borough of Cheshire East
Lists of listed buildings in Cheshire